Techi Kaso is an Indian politician. He is a member of the Legislative Assembly of Arunachal Pradesh from the Itanagar constituency. In the 2019 election he came back to power once again defending against Kipa Babu by a thin margin.

References

Indian National Congress politicians from Arunachal Pradesh
Living people
People's Party of Arunachal politicians
Arunachal Pradesh MLAs 2014–2019
Year of birth missing (living people)
Janata Dal (United) politicians from Arunachal Pradesh
Arunachal Pradesh MLAs 2009–2014
Arunachal Pradesh MLAs 2019–2024
Nationalist Congress Party politicians from Arunachal Pradesh